Duke William Frederick Philip of Württemberg (27 December 1761, in Stettin – 10 August 1830, in Schloss von Stetten im Remstal) was a prince of the House of Württemberg and a minister for war.

Early life
William was the fourth son of Frederick II Eugene, Duke of Württemberg and Sophia Dorothea of Brandenburg-Schwedt, eldest daughter of Frederick William, Margrave of Brandenburg-Schwedt and Princess Sophia Dorothea of Prussia, a niece of Frederick II of Prussia.

Military career
In 1779 he joined the Royal Danish Army and quickly rose to the rank of Oberst. In 1781 he commanded his own regiment, being promoted to major general in 1783, moved to the Danish Foot Guards in 1785 and promoted to lieutenant general in 1795. In 1801 he became governor of Copenhagen and later the same year faced the Battle of Copenhagen in that role.

In 1806 he paid 10,000 Reichstaler to leave the Danish army. His brother Frederick had just been made king of Württemberg and in Stuttgart made William a field marshal and Württemberg's minister for war. From 1810 to 1821 William temporarily lived in his manor house at Hirrlingen near Rottenburg but more often in the Schloss Stetten in Remstal. On 29 June 1811 he took on Freiherr Friedrich von Phull as vice-president of the War Department (and de facto Minister for War, though William remained minister de jure until 1815).

In 1815, on leaving office, William shifted to studying science and successfully practised as a physician. In 1817 the University of Tübingen awarded him an honorary degree in medicine. As a member of the royal house of Württemberg, William also held a seat in the Kammer der Standesherren (House of Lords) of the Württembergische Landstände parliament from 1819 to his death in 1830.

Marriage and issue 

On 23 August 1800, in Coswig, Frederick married one of his mother's ladies in waiting, Wilhelmine Freiin von Tunderfeld-Rhodis (1777–1822), daughter of Baron Karl August Wilhelm von Tunderfeld-Rhodis. She was a scion of a military family from Sweden, originally from the Baltic.

The couple had six children, only three of whom reached adulthood:
 Count Alexander of Württemberg (1801–1844), poet; married Countess Helene Festetics von Tolna (1812–1886), daughter of Ladislas Graf Festetics of Tolna.
 Count August of Württemberg (1805–1808)
 Wilhelm, Duke of Urach, Count of Württemberg (1810–1869); married firstly Princess Théodolinde of Leuchtenberg (1814–1857). He married secondly Princess Florestine of Monaco (1833–1897).
 Count Friedrich August of Württemberg (1811–1812)
 Count Franz of Württemberg (1814–1824)
 Countess Marie of Württemberg (1815–1866); married Count Wilhelm of Taubenheim (1805–1894).

Since this was a morganatic marriage, on 1 August 1801 William renounced his descendants' claim to the throne of Württemberg. This had an effect in 1921, on the death of William II of Württemberg, when his descendants were excluded from inheriting. However, by then the Kingdom of Württemberg had itself been superseded.

Ancestry

Honours 
 Grand Cross of the  Order of the Württemberg Crown<ref name="Staatshandbuch">Königlich Württembergisches Hof- und Staatshandbuch 1824, S. 8</ref>
 Grand Cross of the Württemberg Military Merit Order
 1803 Knights' Cross of the Danish Order of the Elephant
 Grand Cross of the French Legion of Honour

See also
 History of Württemberg
 History of Denmark#The 19th century

 Bibliography 
 Wolfgang Schmierer: Wilhelm, Herzog von Württemberg, in Sönke Lorenz, Dieter Mertens, Volker Press eds. Das Haus Württemberg: Ein biographisches Lexikon. Kohlhammer, Stuttgart 1997, S. 380 f.
 Frank Raberg: Biographisches Handbuch der württembergischen Landtagsabgeordneten 1815–1933''. Kohlhammer Verlag, Stuttgart 2001, S. 1050 f.

References 

1761 births
1830 deaths
People from Szczecin
People from the Province of Pomerania
William Frederick Philip
German commanders of the Napoleonic Wars
Danish military commanders of the Napoleonic Wars
German Lutherans
Sons of monarchs